The sodium–potassium pump (sodium–potassium adenosine triphosphatase, also known as Na⁺/K⁺-ATPase, Na⁺/K⁺ pump, or sodium–potassium ATPase) is an enzyme (an electrogenic transmembrane ATPase) found in the membrane of all animal cells. It performs several functions in cell physiology.

The Na⁺/K⁺-ATPase enzyme is active (i.e. it uses energy from ATP). For every ATP molecule that the pump uses, three sodium ions are exported and two potassium ions are imported. Thus, there is a net export of a single positive charge per pump cycle.

The sodium–potassium pump was discovered in 1957 by the Danish scientist Jens Christian Skou, who was awarded a Nobel Prize for his work in 1997. Its discovery marked an important step forward in the understanding of how ions get into and out of cells, and it has particular significance for excitable cells such as nerve cells, which depend on this pump to respond to stimuli and transmit impulses.

All mammals have four different sodium pump sub-types, or isoforms. Each has unique properties and tissue expression patterns. This enzyme belongs to the family of P-type ATPases.

Function 
The Na⁺/K⁺-ATPase helps maintain resting potential, affects transport, and regulates cellular volume. It also functions as a signal transducer/integrator to regulate the MAPK pathway, reactive oxygen species (ROS), as well as intracellular calcium. In fact, all cells expend a large fraction of the ATP they produce (typically 30% and up to 70% in
nerve cells) to maintain their required cytosolic Na and K
concentrations.
For neurons, the Na⁺/K⁺-ATPase can be responsible for up to 3/4 of the cell's energy expenditure. In many types of tissue, ATP consumption by the Na⁺/K⁺-ATPases have been related to glycolysis. This was first discovered in red blood cells (Schrier, 1966), but has later been evidenced in renal cells, smooth muscles surrounding the blood vessels, and cardiac purkinje cells. Recently, glycolysis has also been shown to be of particular importance for Na⁺/K⁺-ATPases in skeletal muscles, where inhibition of glycogen breakdown (a substrate for glycolysis) leads to reduced Na⁺/K⁺-ATPase activity and lower force production.

Resting potential 

In order to maintain the cell membrane potential, cells keep a low concentration of sodium ions and high levels of potassium ions within the cell (intracellular). The sodium–potassium pump mechanism moves 3 sodium ions out and moves 2 potassium ions in, thus, in total, removing one positive charge carrier from the intracellular space (see Mechanism for details). In addition, there is a short-circuit channel (i.e. a highly K-permeable ion channel) for potassium in the membrane, thus the voltage across the plasma membrane is close to the Nernst potential of potassium.

Reversal potential 
Even if both K⁺ and Na⁺ ions have the same charge, they can still have very different equilibrium potentials for both outside and/or inside concentrations. The sodium-potassium pump moves toward a nonequilibrium state with the relative concentrations of Na⁺ and K⁺ for both inside and outside of cell. For instance, the concentration of K⁺ in cytosol is 100mM, whereas the concentration of Na⁺ is 10mM. On the other hand, in extracellular space, the concentration of K⁺ is 5mM, whereas the concentration of Na⁺ is 150mM.

Transport 
Export of sodium ions from the cell provides the driving force for several secondary active transporters such as membrane transport proteins, which import glucose, amino acids and other nutrients into the cell by use of the sodium ion gradient.

Another important task of the Na⁺-K⁺ pump is to provide a Na⁺ gradient that is used by certain carrier processes. In the gut, for example, sodium is transported out of the reabsorbing cell on the blood (interstitial fluid) side via the Na⁺-K⁺ pump, whereas, on the reabsorbing (lumenal) side, the Na⁺-glucose symporter uses the created Na⁺ gradient as a source of energy to import both Na⁺ and glucose, which is far more efficient than simple diffusion. Similar processes are located in the renal tubular system.

Controlling cell volume 

Failure of the Na⁺-K⁺ pumps can result in swelling of the cell. A cell's osmolarity is the sum of the concentrations of the various ion species and many proteins and other organic compounds inside the cell. When this is higher than the osmolarity outside of the cell, water flows into the cell through osmosis. This can cause the cell to swell up and lyse. The Na⁺-K⁺ pump helps to maintain the right concentrations of ions.
Furthermore, when the cell begins to swell, this automatically activates the Na⁺-K⁺ pump because it changes the internal concentrations of Na⁺-K⁺ to which the pump is sensitive.

Functioning as signal transducer 
Within the last decade, many independent labs have demonstrated that, in addition to the classical ion transporting, this membrane protein can also relay extracellular ouabain-binding signalling into the cell through regulation of protein tyrosine phosphorylation. For instance, a study investigated the function of Na+/K+ ATPase in foot muscle and hepatopancreas in land snail O.Lactea by comparing the active and estivating states. They concluded that reversible phosphorylation can control the same means of coordinating ATP use by this ion pump with the rates of the ATP generation by catabolic pathways in estivating O. Lactea. The downstream signals through ouabain-triggered protein phosphorylation events include activation of the mitogen-activated protein kinase (MAPK) signal cascades, mitochondrial reactive oxygen species (ROS) production, as well as activation of phospholipase C (PLC) and inositol triphosphate (IP3) receptor (IP3R) in different intracellular compartments.

Protein-protein interactions play a very important role in Na⁺-K⁺ pump-mediated signal transduction. For example, the Na⁺-K⁺ pump interacts directly with Src, a non-receptor tyrosine kinase, to form a signaling receptor complex. Src is initially inhibited by the Na⁺-K⁺ pump. However, upon subsequent ouabain binding, the Src kinase domain is released and then activated. Based on this scenario, NaKtide, a peptide Src inhibitor derived from the Na⁺-K⁺ pump, was developed as a functional ouabain–Na⁺-K⁺ pump-mediated signal transduction. Na⁺-K⁺ pump also interacts with ankyrin, IP3R, PI3K, PLCgamma1 and cofilin.

Controlling neuron activity states 
The Na⁺-K⁺ pump has been shown to control and set the intrinsic activity mode of cerebellar Purkinje neurons, accessory olfactory bulb mitral cells and probably other neuron types. This suggests that the pump might not simply be a homeostatic, "housekeeping" molecule for ionic gradients, but could be a computation element in the cerebellum and the brain. Indeed, a mutation in the Na⁺-K⁺ pump causes rapid onset dystonia-parkinsonism, which has symptoms to indicate that it is a pathology of cerebellar computation. Furthermore, an ouabain block of Na⁺-K⁺ pumps in the cerebellum of a live mouse results in it displaying ataxia and dystonia. Alcohol inhibits sodium–potassium pumps in the cerebellum and this is likely how it corrupts cerebellar computation and body coordination. The distribution of the Na⁺-K⁺ pump on myelinated axons in the human brain has been demonstrated to be along the internodal axolemma, and not within the nodal axolemma as previously thought. The Na⁺-K⁺ pump disfunction has been tied to various diseases, including epilepsy and brain malformations.

Mechanism 

Looking at the process starting from the interior of the cell:
The pump has a higher affinity for Na⁺ ions than K⁺ ions, thus after binding ATP, binds 3 intracellular Na⁺ ions.
ATP is hydrolyzed, leading to phosphorylation of the pump at a highly conserved aspartate residue and subsequent release of ADP. This process leads to a conformational change in the pump. 
The conformational change exposes the Na⁺ ions to the extracellular region. The phosphorylated form of the pump has a low affinity for Na⁺ ions, so they are released; by contrast it has high affinity for the K⁺ ions.
The pump binds 2 extracellular K⁺ ions, which induces dephosphorylation of the pump, reverting it to its previous conformational state, thus releasing the K⁺ ions into the cell.
The unphosphorylated form of the pump has a higher affinity for Na⁺ ions. ATP binds, and the process starts again.

Regulation

Endogenous 
The Na⁺/K⁺-ATPase is upregulated by cAMP. Thus, substances causing an increase in cAMP upregulate the Na⁺/K⁺-ATPase. These include the ligands of the Gs-coupled GPCRs. In contrast, substances causing a decrease in cAMP downregulate the Na⁺/K⁺-ATPase. These include the ligands of the Gi-coupled GPCRs. Note: Early studies indicated the opposite effect, but these were later found to be inaccurate due to additional complicating factors. 

The Na⁺/K⁺-ATPase is endogenously negatively regulated by the inositol pyrophosphate 5-InsP7, an intracellular signaling molecule generated by IP6K1, which relieves an autoinhibitory domain of PI3K p85α to drive endocytosis and degradation.

The Na⁺/K⁺-ATPase is also regulated by reversible phosphorylation. Research has shown that in estivating animals, the Na⁺/K⁺-ATPase is in the phosphorylated and low activity form. Dephosphorylation of Na⁺/K⁺-ATPase can recover it to the high activity form.

Exogenous 
The Na⁺/K⁺-ATPase can be pharmacologically modified by administrating drugs exogenously. Its expression can also be modified through hormones such as triiodothyronine, a thyroid hormone.

For instance, Na⁺/K⁺-ATPase found in the membrane of heart cells is an important target of cardiac glycosides (for example digoxin and ouabain), inotropic drugs used to improve heart performance by increasing its force of contraction.

Muscle contraction is dependent on a 100- to 10,000-times-higher-than-resting intracellular Ca²⁺ concentration, which is caused by Ca²⁺ release from the muscle cells' sarcoplasmic reticulum. Immediately after muscle contraction, intracellular Ca²⁺ is quickly returned to its normal concentration by a carrier enzyme in the plasma membrane, and a calcium pump in sarcoplasmic reticulum, causing the muscle to relax.

According to the Blaustein-hypothesis, this carrier enzyme (Na⁺/Ca²⁺ exchanger, NCX) uses the Na gradient generated by the Na⁺-K⁺ pump to remove Ca²⁺ from the intracellular space, hence slowing down the Na⁺-K⁺ pump results in a permanently elevated Ca²⁺ level in the muscle, which may be the mechanism of the long-term inotropic effect of cardiac glycosides such as digoxin. The problem with this hypothesis is that at pharmacological concentrations of digitalis, less than 5% of Na/K-ATPase molecules—specifically the α2 isoform in heart and arterial smooth muscle (Kd = 32 nM) -- are inhibited, not enough to affect the intracellular concentration of Na⁺. However, apart from the population of Na/K-ATPase in the plasma membrane—responsible for ion transport --, there is another population in the caveolae which acts as digitalis receptor and stimulates the EGF receptor.

Pharmacologic regulation 

In certain conditions such as in the case of cardiac disease, the Na⁺/K⁺-ATPase may need to be inhibited via pharmacological means. A commonly used inhibitor used in the treatment of cardiac disease would be digoxin which essentially binds "to the extracellular part of enzyme i.e. that binds potassium, when it is in a phosphorylated state, to transfer potassium inside the cell" After this essential binding occurs, a dephosphorylation of the alpha subunit occurs which reduces the effect of cardiac disease. It is via the inhibiting of the Na⁺/K⁺-ATPase that sodium levels will begin to increase within the cell which ultimately increases the concentration of intracellular calcium via the sodium-calcium exchanger. This increased presence of calcium is what allows for the force of contraction to be increased. In the case of patients where the heart is not pumping hard enough to provide what is needed for the body this approach allows for the temporary overcoming of this.

Discovery 
Na⁺/K⁺-ATPase was discovered by Jens Christian Skou in 1957 while working as assistant professor at the Department of Physiology, University of Aarhus, Denmark. He published his work that year.

In 1997, he received one-half of the Nobel Prize in Chemistry "for the first discovery of an ion-transporting enzyme, Na⁺,K⁺-ATPase."

Genes 
 Alpha: ATP1A1, ATP1A2, ATP1A3, ATP1A4. #1 predominates in kidney. #2 is also known as "alpha(+)"
 Beta: ATP1B1, ATP1B3,

In insects 
Mutagenesis studies conducted by Susanne Dobler have identified the conserved M3-M4 hairpin and M5-M6 hairpins. At position 312, insects feeding on Apocynum species differed from mammalian Na⁺/K⁺-ATPase through the change of glutamic acid to aspartic acid. Thus, the insects were found to have a higher degree of conservation in the C-terminal of the ouabain binding pocket. Dobler et al. found 87% amino acid identity among insect sequences, which shows a high level of molecular convergence among four orders of insect herbivores. Thus, some substitutions provide resistance to cardenolides as an adaptation even across phylogenetic branches.

See also 
Thyroid hormone
V-ATPase

References

External links 
 
 RCSB Protein Data Bank: Sodium–Potassium Pump
 A video by Khan Academy.
 

EC 3.6.3
Transport proteins